Pisgah is an unincorporated community in Morgan County in the U.S. state of Illinois, southeast of Jacksonville. Pisgah is located on Illinois Route 104.

References

Unincorporated communities in Morgan County, Illinois
Unincorporated communities in Illinois